The 1968 Detroit riot was a civil disturbance that occurred between April 4–5, 1968 in Detroit, Michigan following the assassination of Martin Luther King Jr. Less than a year after the violent unrest of 1967, areas of 12th Street (present-day Rosa Parks Boulevard) again erupted in chaos (simultaneously with over 100 other US cities) following King's assassination. Michigan Governor George W. Romney ordered the National Guard into Detroit. One person was killed, and gangs tossed objects at cars and smashed storefront windows with three dozen fires being set.

See also
List of incidents of civil unrest in the United States

Other riots in Detroit
Detroit race riot of 1863
Detroit race riot of 1943
1967 Detroit riot (also erupted on 12th Street)
Livernois–Fenkell riot

References

1968 in Michigan
Detroit
African-American history in Detroit
Detroit
Riots and civil disorder in Detroit
1968 in Detroit
April 1968 events in the United States